The 2012 Korean Grand Prix (formally known as the 2012 Formula 1 Korean Grand Prix) was a Formula One motor race that was the sixteenth round of the 2012 Formula One season. It was held on 14 October 2012 at the Korea International Circuit near Yeongam in South Korea's South Jeolla Province. The race marked the third running of the Korean Grand Prix.

Mark Webber started the race from pole alongside Sebastian Vettel, who went on to win the race. With championship rival Fernando Alonso finishing third, Vettel took a six-point championship lead. The organisers of the race invited Korean rapper PSY to wave the chequered flag.

Report

Background
The detection point was brought forward; in 2011, it was positioned between the first two corners, but for 2012, it was moved to be  before the first corner.

Like the 2011 Korean Grand Prix, tyre supplier Pirelli brought its yellow-banded soft compound tyre as the harder "prime" tyre and the red-banded supersoft compound tyre as the softer "option" tyre.

Marussia's Charles Pic was given a ten-place grid penalty for exceeding the maximum number of engines that he was permitted to use over the course of the season.

Several reserve drivers took the place of regular drivers for the first free practice session. Giedo van der Garde drove in place of Caterham's Vitaly Petrov, while Jules Bianchi replaced Nico Hülkenberg at Force India, Valtteri Bottas drove Bruno Senna's Williams and Dani Clos took Narain Karthikeyan's place at HRT.

Free practice

In contrast to the practice sessions of the 2010 and 2011 races, the first free practice session of the 2012 race took place in dry conditions. Lewis Hamilton ended the session as fastest driver, three tenths of a second ahead of Fernando Alonso — who had led most of the ninety-minute session — with Mark Webber in third place. Sebastian Vettel was fastest in the second session, leading teammate Webber and Alonso in third. Like the first session, the second passed without incident, although Sergio Pérez was forced out after forty-five minutes of running when his Sauber lost all power and ground to a halt at Turn 12. Pérez was able to safely park the car, allowing the session to continue uninterrupted.

Race
Mark Webber, who qualified on pole, lost his lead at start to teammate Sebastian Vettel at the first turn. Lewis Hamilton lost his third place to Alonso on first lap, while his team mate Jenson Button had to retire after a collision with Kobayashi, who also collided with Nico Rosberg of Mercedes. Lewis Hamilton made a pit stop on lap 14, creating a chain reaction where Massa and Webber stopped on lap 15 and finally Vettel and Alonso stopped on lap 16. The latter rejoined side-by-side with Sergio Pérez, outdragging him on the back straight. Hamilton seized his opportunity and swept around the outside of Pérez just a few corners later. Felipe Massa moved to 4th place after overtaking Hamilton who was suffering from an anti-roll bar failure on his car, which led him to lose couple of places in the race. Massa was quickly gaining on his teammate when he was told to hold his position on his team radio as Alonso was the championship contender. At the end of the race Vettel was continuously told on his team radio to slow down and save tyres as he had a problem with tyre degradation on his right-front tyre. Vettel finished first and took a six-point lead in the Championship over third-placed Fernando Alonso, who had led since the European Grand Prix.  Webber finished second, setting the fastest lap.  Lewis Hamilton finished 10th after battling for position with the two Toro Rossos of Daniel Ricciardo and Jean-Éric Vergne, but fell back in the closing laps as a piece of AstroTurf got stuck on one of his car's sidepods.

Classification

Qualifying

Notes:
 — Daniel Ricciardo received a five-place grid penalty for an unscheduled gearbox change.
 — Charles Pic was given a ten-place grid penalty for exceeding the maximum number of engines permitted for use over the course of the season.
 — Narain Karthikeyan failed to set a time after having a brake failure. He was allowed to race at the stewards' discretion.

Race

Championship standings after the race

Drivers' Championship standings

Constructors' Championship standings

 Note: Only the top five positions are included for both sets of standings.
 Bold text and an asterisk indicates competitors who still had a theoretical chance of becoming World Champion.

References

Korea
Korean Grand Prix
2012
Korean Grand Prix